Kalam Bey, (Turkish: Kalem Bey; died 1303, Karesi) was the first ruler of the Karasids. He was succeeded by Karasi Bey in 1303.

References 

1303 deaths
Anatolian beyliks
Year of birth unknown